Lucian Thomas Baldwin III is a bond trader investor and founder of the Baldwin Group of companies. He was described by the Wall Street Journal as a trader who can singlehandedly move the Treasury bond market.  He often trades the 30-year bond in the pits of the Chicago Board of Trade.

Career 
After receiving his master's degree in agribusiness Baldwin worked as a meat packer in Ohio. He took advice from a friend and moved to Chicago with some trading knowledge from a few courses taken at graduate school. Due to high inflation in the US in the 1980s, hedgers and speculators preferred trading in treasury bonds. Baldwin followed this trend.

Baldwin experienced success as a bond trader, and leased a seat on the Chicago exchange. As a full member director of the Chicago Board of Trade, Baldwin has served on its executive committee and Commodity Pool Operator/Commodity Trading Advisor committee, in addition to other positions. He currently serves as chairman of Baldwin Group Ltd., the parent company of several investment and financial services. Companies in the group include: Baldwin Commodities Corp., a Treasury Bond Futures proprietary trading company, and Baldwin Managed Futures, a CTA. Baldwin is also the current owner of Granot Loma, the great American castle on the southern shore of Lake Superior in Marquette County, Michigan.

In 2009, he was inducted into the Futures Hall of Fame, which had been established in 2005 to commemorate outstanding contributions to the global futures and options community.

Notes

Further reading 
 Schwager, Jack D. Market Wizards: Interviews with Top Traders, Collins: 1993, 

1956 births
American money managers
American financial analysts
American hedge fund managers
Living people
Stock and commodity market managers
American philanthropists
American investors
20th-century American businesspeople